The 2013–14 KHL season was the sixth season of the Kontinental Hockey League.

The league's 28 teams played a 54-game balanced schedule. The regular season began on 4 September with the Lokomotiv Cup between last year's finalists Dynamo Moscow and Traktor Chelyabinsk. The all-star game took place on 11 January in Bratislava, Slovakia and was followed by a 27-day break for the 2014 Winter Olympics in Sochi from 30 January to 25 February. The last day of the regular season was 4 March.

Sixteen teams, eight from each conference, advanced to the Gagarin Cup playoffs, which began on 7 March. The winner of each conference, Metallurg Magnitogorsk from the East and Lev Prague from the West, met in the Gagarin Cup Final. The seventh and last game was played on 30 April, with Metallurg winning 7-4. All four playoff rounds were best-of-seven series. As of right now, Lev Prague are the only non-Russian team to play in the Gagarin Cup

Changes

Team changes
In late April 2013 it was announced that a newly created team from Vladivostok would be admitted to league and become the league's second far-eastern team. The team is called Admiral Vladivostok and its name and emblem were chosen by the public. Its initial roster was filled in an expansion draft on 17 June.

A few days after Vladivostok was admitted to the league it was also confirmed that KHL Medveščak from Zagreb, Croatia would join the league. Medveščak previously played in Austrian-based EBEL league. This made Croatia the eighth country with a KHL team.

In June 2013 Vityaz Chekhov officially announced its relocation to nearby Podolsk, Moscow Oblast where it can play in a bigger arena.

Regular season
The regular season began on 4 September 2013 with the Lokomotiv Cup between the finalists of the previous season, Dynamo Moscow and Traktor Chelyabinsk and ended on 4 March 2014 after every team has played 54 matches.

League standings

Points are awarded as follows:
3 Points for a win in regulation ("W")
2 Points for a win in overtime ("OTW") or a penalty shootout ("SOW")
1 Point for a loss in overtime ("OTL") or a penalty shootout ("SOL")
0 Points for a loss in regulation ("L")

The conference standings determine the seedings for the play-offs. The first two places in each conference are reserved for the division winners.

Player statistics

Scoring leaders

  
GP = Games played; G = Goals; A = Assists; Pts = Points; +/– = Plus-minus; PIM = Penalty minutes

Leading goaltenders

GP = Games played; Min = Minutes played; W = Wins; L = Losses; SOP = Shootouts played; GA = Goals against; SO = Shutouts; SV% = Save percentage; GAA = Goals against average

Playoffs
The playoffs started on 7 March 2014, with the top eight teams from each of the conferences, and ended on 30 April with the last game of the Gagarin Cup final.

During the first three rounds home ice was determined by seeding number within the Conference, not position on the bracket. In the Finals the team with better seeding number had home ice advantage. If the seeding numbers were equal, the regular season record was taken into account.

Player statistics

Playoff scoring leaders
Updated on 30 April 2014. Source: khl.ru

  
GP = Games played; G = Goals; A = Assists; Pts = Points; +/– = Plus-minus; PIM = Penalty minutes

Playoff leading goaltenders
Updated on 30 April 2014. Source: khl.ru

GP = Games played; Min = Minutes played; W = Wins; L = Losses; SOL = Shootout losses; GA = Goals against; SO = Shutouts; SV% = Save percentage; GAA = Goals against average

Nadezhda Cup
The 12 teams that do not advance to Gagarin Cup Playoffs participate in Nadezhda Cup. The teams ranked 9th and 10th in their conferences are seeded and start their games from Quarterfinals, while the other teams start their games from the First Round. The First Round consists of two games. In case there is a 1–1 tie in the end of the First Round, 5-minute overtime and a penalty shootout, if necessary, follow after Game 2. The other rounds consist of up to four games. If there is a 2–2 tie in the end of such a round, the series is decided in a 20-minute overtime with a shootout if necessary.

* Note: Spartak Moscow was excluded from Nadezhda Cup 2014 tournament due to financial issues.

Final standings

Awards

Players of the Month

Best KHL players of each month.

References

 
Kontinental Hockey League seasons
1
1
1
1